Mary Christine McConkey (February 29, 1916 – October 27, 1981) was a competitive swimmer who swam in freestyle and backstroke events.  As a 19-year-old, McConkey represented Canada at the 1936 Summer Olympics in Berlin, Germany.  She was a member of the Canadian team that finished fourth in the women's 4x100-metre freestyle relay.  Individually, McConkey also competed in the women's 100-metre backstroke, but she did not advance beyond the first round.

References

External links
 
 
 

1916 births
1981 deaths
Canadian female backstroke swimmers
Canadian female freestyle swimmers
Olympic swimmers of Canada
Swimmers at the 1936 Summer Olympics